Dehqan may refer to:
 Dehqan, Kerman
 Dehqan, Khuzestan